Nandcoomar Bodha MP (born नन्दकुमार बोधा on 3 February 1954) is a Mauritian politician and former Minister of Foreign Affairs of Mauritius. He was also the Minister of Tourism & Leisure of Mauritius. He has been holding the office since 11 May 2010 to 26 July 2011, He held the same office from 2000 to 2003 in the MSM/MMM coalition government. When Pravind Jugnauth was sworn as Deputy Prime Minister, he took the office of Minister of Agriculture in 2003 up to 2005.He was appointed 8th position in the Cabinet of Navin Ramgoolam.

He is the general secretary of the Militant Socialist Movement since 1996. He is a journalist by profession and graduated from the University of Rennes in France. He has been an educator at the secondary level before moving to the national television network, the Mauritius Broadcasting Corporation in 1980s. In 1991 he is appointed as Managing Director of the MBC, position which he held up to 1995 until Navin Ramgoolam became Prime Minister and appointed another person to the office.

He was a candidate of the MSM in 1995 but the massive victory of the Mauritian Labour Party and Mauritian Militant Movement alliance decided else. During the period he pursued his studies and graduated from an LLB from the University of Wolverhampton in 1999. He was called to the bar in 2000 and started practice from that period.

In 2000, the MSM/MMM coalition wins the election and he is elected as 1st Member serving for Constituency No 16, Vacoas Floreal. He is appointed as Minister of Tourism & Leisure in the Cabinet of Anerood Jugnauth. Pravind Jugnauth was appointed as Minister of Agriculture. In 2003, Jugnaut's resignation and Paul Berenger's appointment as Prime Minister made some changes to the cabinet. Pravind Jugnauth was sworn as Deputy Prime Minister and Bodha backed him as Minister of Agriculture from 2003 to 2005.

In 2005, the MSM/MMM coalition loses the general elections to Navin Ramgoolam. Pravind Jugnauth, Leader of the MSM is not elected and therefore Berenger assumes the role of the Leader of Opposition. In 2006 the coalition breaks up and MSM becomes the second-largest party in the parliament. Thus the leader of the opposition was to be an MSM MP. Jugnauth announced that Bodha would hold the office until two MSM MPs left the alliance and regrouped with the Mauritian Labour Party. The MMM became the second-largest party and thus Berenger is once again appointed as Leader of the Opposition.

In 2010, the Ptr-MSM-PMSD alliance won the general elections. He was therefore once again appointed as Minister of Tourism but resigned from his position as all other cabinet members of the MSM did. After being elected in the 2014 general elections, he was appointed Minister of Public Infrastructure and Land Transport as from 15 December 2014 to 12 November 2019. He was again elected in the 2019 general elections and was this time appointed as minister for foreign affairs and regional integration until 5 February 2021.

On 6 February 2021, Mr Nandcoomar Bodha resigned as minister and as member of the "Movement Socialiste Militant". He now sits with  opposition members since March 2021.

References

1954 births
Living people
Rennes 2 University alumni
Alumni of the University of Wolverhampton
20th-century Mauritian lawyers
Militant Socialist Movement politicians
Agriculture ministers of Mauritius
Foreign Ministers of Mauritius
Infrastructure ministers of Mauritius
Trade ministers of Mauritius
Tourism ministers of Mauritius
Mauritian politicians of Indian descent